Spilomyia manicata is a species of Hoverfly in the family Syrphidae.

Distribution
Italy.

References

Eristalinae
Insects described in 1865
Taxa named by Camillo Rondani
Diptera of Europe